Speight v Gaunt [1883] UKHL 1 is an English trusts law case, concerning the extent of the duty of care owed by a fiduciary.

Facts
Mr John Speight, a Bradford industrialist, had appointed Mr Isaac Gaunt and Mr Alfred Wilkinson as trustees for his estate in his will. The trustees employed a young broker, John Cooke, to invest £15,000 of the estate's money into company shares. The trustees gave over the money. The broker dishonestly took the money for himself, and gave excuses for the delays in getting the company shares. The truth only transpired when Cooke was declared bankrupt. The beneficiaries of Speight's trust sued Mr Gaunt for failing in his duty of care as a trustee.

Judgment

Court of Appeal
Sir George Jessel MR held that because the trustee acted in the ordinary course of business, he was not liable to make good the loss occasioned by the embezzlement of the trust moneys by the broker. The key part of his judgment stated as follows.

Lindley LJ and Bowen LJ gave concurring judgments.

House of Lords
The House of Lords upheld the Court of Appeal. Lord Blackburn said the following:

See also

English trusts law
Morley v Morley (1678) 2 Cases in Chancery 2, 22 ER 817, Lord Nottingham LC

Notes

References

External links

English trusts case law
House of Lords cases
1883 in British law
1883 in case law